|}

The Joe Mac Novice Hurdle is a Grade 3 National Hunt novice hurdle race in Ireland which is open to horses aged four years or older. 
It is run at Tipperary over a distance of about 2 miles (3,218 metres), and it is scheduled to take place each year in October.

The race was awarded Grade 3 status in 2003.

In line with several races at Tipperary, the race is named after a horse owned by J. P. McManus, Joe Mac. Between 2010 and 2016 it was run as the Dolores Purcell Memorial Novice Hurdle.

The race was first run in 1997 and was sponsored for many years by the company owned by J. P. McManus's younger brother, Kevin McManus Bookmakers.

Records
Leading jockey  (4 wins):
 Ruby Walsh – Vital Plot (2008), Bachasson (2015), Penhill (2016), Sayar (2017)

Leading trainer  (7 wins):
 Willie Mullins – Bachasson (2015), Penhill (2016), Sayar (2017), Quick Grabim (2018), Shewearsitwell (2020), Purple Mountain (2021), Champ Kiely (2022)

Winners

See also
 Horse racing in Ireland
 List of Irish National Hunt races

References
Racing Post:

National Hunt hurdle races
National Hunt races in Ireland
Tipperary Racecourse
Recurring sporting events established in 1997
1997 establishments in Ireland